Firesprite is a British video game developer formed in 2012 by former members of the Studio Liverpool based in Liverpool.

History
Firesprite was founded in 2012 by Graeme Ankers as managing director, Lee Carus as art director, Chris Roberts as technical director, Stuart Tilley as game director, and Stuart Lovegrove as programming director. The studio is staffed by some developers that were part of the original Studio Liverpool when it was called Psygnosis and the five people in the studio's core leadership team have worked on games for every PlayStation console. Psygnosis was mostly known for the Wipeout series.

In 2013, the team helped develop one of the launch titles for the PlayStation 4, an augmented reality game, The Playroom. Run Sackboy! Run! followed on mobile devices in 2014. Again in collaboration with SIE Japan Studio, and one of the launch titles for Playstation VR, The Playroom VR was created "by the same team that brought you The Playroom on PS4" and released in 2016.

Following up in May 2019 it was announced that an update would be released soon for The Persistence. Launching as a free update for owners of the game, the Complete Edition will bring The Persistence to flat-screen TVs for the first time.

In March 2021, the company announced a partnership with Cloud Imperium Games to work on Theaters of War (working title), a large scale combined arms multiplayer game mode in development for their game Star Citizen. Their partnership started in early 2019 after Cloud Imperium outlined their vision for the game mode.

In September 2021, Sony Interactive Entertainment announced that it had acquired the studio. Later in the month Firesprite announced that it had acquired Fabrik Games, bringing the studio's headcount to 265. To accommodate the studio's growth, Sony announced in June 2022 that it would move Firesprite's headquarters to a 50,000 sq-ft office space in Duke & Parr Street.

Games developed

References

External links

2012 establishments in England
2021 mergers and acquisitions
Companies based in Liverpool
British subsidiaries of foreign companies
British companies established in 2012
PlayStation Studios
Video game companies established in 2012
Video game companies of the United Kingdom
Video game development companies